The American Athletic Conference women's basketball tournament (sometimes known simply as The American Championship) is the conference tournament in basketball for the American Athletic Conference.

History 
It is a single-elimination tournament that involves all league schools. Its seeding is based on regular season records. The winner receives the conference's automatic bid to the NCAA women's basketball tournament, however the official conference championship is awarded to the team or teams with the best regular season record. It was announced that an agreement was made to keep the tournament at the Mohegan Sun Arena through 2020.

Champions

Tournament championships by school

Italics indicate school no longer sponsors women's basketball in The American.

See also

 American Athletic Conference men's basketball tournament

References

 
Recurring sporting events established in 2014
2014 establishments in Tennessee